Coleophora saturatella is a moth of the family Coleophoridae. It is found from Sweden to the Pyrenees, the Alps and Albania and from Great Britain to Romania. It has also been recorded from southern Russia.

Description
The wingspan is 12–15 mm.

The larvae feed on broom (Cytisus scoparius), black broom (Lembotropis nigricans), aluaga (Genista scorpius), dyer's greenweed (Genista tinctoria), Spanish broom (Spartium junceum) and gorse Ulex europaeus. They create a very untidy, bivalved lobe case of 7–8 mm. The mouth angle is 90°. Full-grown larvae can be found in June.

References

External links

saturatella
Moths described in 1850
Moths of Europe
Taxa named by Henry Tibbats Stainton